The Meadow is a radio drama by Ray Bradbury, written for a 1947 episode of the radio series World Security Workshop. It was included in the anthology Best One-Act Plays of 1947-1948. Bradbury later revised it into a short story (1953) and a stage play (1960).

Plot
The elderly security guard named Mr. Smith works at a movie studio. He fights to stop the producer, Mr. Douglass, from destroying the set. After Smith and Douglass have a conversation, Douglass is convinced to keep the set which are models of the cities of the world.

External links

References

Short stories by Ray Bradbury
Plays by Ray Bradbury
1953 short stories
1960 plays